Bliss is a 1917 American short comedy film featuring Harold Lloyd. The film was thought lost until a copy was discovered in the Dawson Film Find in 1978.

Plot
Harold and Bebe meet each other by chance while out walking.  Equally smitten, they exchange calling cards.  Harold is a man of modest means while the well-to-do Bebe is "the most eligible girl in town."  Bebe is besieged by wealthy suitors but none of them measure up to her father's standards; he insists his future son-in-law be of noble blood.  Harold rents evening clothes from his laundry man before heading off to Bebe's house to woo her.  When he arrives, Bebe's father assumes Harold is another unsuitable beau and attempts to violently eject him from the house.  Bebe intervenes.  Harold happens to find a calling card in his suit pocket bearing the name "Count Rusva" on it, which convinces Bebe's father that Harold is prime husband material for his daughter. Wanting his daughter to marry Harold quickly, Bebe's father tricks the two of them into thinking each wants to elope. They quickly head to the nearest pastor and are wed.

Cast

 Harold Lloyd as Harold
 Snub Pollard as Snub
 Bebe Daniels as The Girl
 Gus Leonard
 Belle Mitchell

See also
 List of American films of 1917
 Harold Lloyd filmography
 List of rediscovered films

References

External links

 Bliss on YouTube

1917 films
1917 comedy films
1917 short films
1910s rediscovered films
Silent American comedy films
American silent short films
American black-and-white films
Films directed by Alfred J. Goulding
Articles containing video clips
American comedy short films
Rediscovered American films
Surviving American silent films
1910s American films
1910s English-language films